Hyphomicrobium vulgare is a bacterium from the genus of Hyphomicrobium.

References

Further reading

 
 
  
 
 

 

Hyphomicrobiales
Bacteria described in 1899